Pedro Cruz Sanchez (June 29, 1925 – August 16, 1987) also known as Doc Sanchez, was a Guamanian politician, educator and historian, was President of the University of Guam from 1970 to 1974.

Early life and career
Sanchez was born on June 29, 1925, to school superintendent and Tamuning-Tumon Commissioner Simon Angeles Sanchez and Antonia Cruz Sanchez.

Sanchez was married to Florida Galeai'i, and together they have had children: Simon II, Anthony Peter, Antolina S. Leon Guerrero, Florida, Dolores Anne, Paul, and Amanda.

Sanchez was President of the University of Guam from 1970 to 1974.

1978 Bordallo-Sanchez gubernatorial campaign
Ricardo J. Bordallo ran with Sanchez as his running mate in the 1978 election for Governor of Guam. The Bordallo-Sanchez ticket was defeated in the general election by the Republican Calvo-Ada team.

Term in Guam Legislature and death
In 1986, Sanchez ran as a Democrat for a seat in the Guam Legislature. In the primary, Sanchez placed 18, and proceeded to the general election where he placed 17 and was elected to serve as a senator in the 19th Guam Legislature. A special election was held in November 1987 to fill the vacant seat left by Sanchez' death.

Electoral history

References

1925 births
1987 deaths
20th-century American politicians
Chamorro people
Guamanian Democrats
Members of the Legislature of Guam